This is a list of schools in Shropshire, England.

State-funded schools

Primary schools

Adderley CE Primary School, Adderley
Albrighton Primary School, Albrighton
Alveley Primary School, Alveley
Barrow 1618 CE Free School, Barrow
Baschurch CE Primary School, Baschurch
Beckbury CE Primary School, Beckbury
Belvidere Primary School, Shrewsbury
Bicton CE Primary School, Bicton
Bishop Hooper CE Primary School, Ashford Carbonell
Bishop's Castle Primary School, Bishop's Castle
Bitterley CE Primary School, Bitterley
Bomere Heath Primary School, Bomere Heath
Brockton CE Primary School, Brockton
Broseley CE Primary School, Broseley
Brown Clee CE Primary School, Ditton Priors
Bryn Offa CE Primary School, Pant
Buildwas Academy, Buildwas
Buntingsdale Primary School, Ternhill
Burford CE Primary School, Burford
Castlefields Primary School, Oldbury
Cheswardine Primary School, Cheswardine
Chirbury CE Primary School, Chirbury
Christ Church CE Primary School, Cressage
Church Preen Primary School, Church Preen
Claverley CE Primary School, Claverley
Clee Hill Community Academy, Cleehill
Cleobury Mortimer Primary School, Cleobury Mortimer
Clive CE Primary School, Clive
Clunbury CE Primary School, Clunbury
Cockshutt CE Primary School, Cockshutt
Coleham Primary School, Shrewsbury
Condover CE Primary School, Condover
Corvedale CE Primary School, Diddlebury
Criftins CE Primary School, Criftins
Crowmoor Primary School, Shrewsbury
Ellesmere Primary School, Ellesmere
Farlow CE Primary School, Farlow
Gobowen Primary School, Gobowen
Grange Primary School, Shrewsbury
Greenacres Primary School, Shrewsbury
Greenfields Primary School, Shrewsbury
Hadnall CE Primary School, Hadnall
Harlescott Junior School, Shrewsbury
Highley Community Primary School, Highley
Hinstock Primary School, Hinstock
Hodnet Primary School, Hodnet
Holy Trinity CE Primary Academy, Oswestry
John Wilkinson Primary School, Broseley
Kinlet CE Primary School, Kinlet
Kinnerley CE Primary School, Kinnerley
Long Mountain CE Primary School, Worthen
Longden CE Primary School, Longden
Longlands Primary School, Market Drayton
Longnor CE Primary School, Longnor
Lower Heath CE Primary School, Prees
Ludlow Primary School, Ludlow
Lydbury North CE Primary School, Lydbury North
Market Drayton Infant School, Market Drayton
Market Drayton Junior School, Market Drayton
The Martin Wilson School, Shrewsbury
The Meadows Primary School, Oswestry
Meole Brace CE Primary School, Meole Brace
Mereside CE Primary School, Shrewsbury
Minsterley Primary School, Minsterley
Morda CE Primary School, Morda
Moreton Say CE Primary School, Moreton Say
Morville CE Primary School, Morville
Mount Pleasant Primary, Shrewsbury
Much Wenlock Primary School, Much Wenlock
Myddle CE Primary School, Myddle
Newcastle CE Primary School, Newcastle
Newtown CE Primary School, Newtown
Norbury Primary School, Norbury
Norton-in-Hales CE Primary School, Norton in Hales
Oakmeadow CE Primary School, Bayston Hill
Onny CE Primary School, Onibury
Our Lady and St Oswald's RC Primary School, Oswestry
Oxon CE Primary School, Shrewsbury
Pontesbury CE Primary School, Pontesbury
Prees CE Primary School, Prees
Radbrook Primary School, Shrewsbury
Rushbury CE Primary School, Rushbury
St Andrew's CE Primary School, Nesscliffe
St Andrew's CE Primary School, Shifnal
St Edward's CE Primary School, Dorrington
St George's CE Academy, Clun
St George's Junior School, Shrewsbury
St Giles CE Primary School, Shrewsbury
St John the Baptist CE Primary School, Ruyton-XI-Towns
St John's RC Primary School, Bridgnorth
St Laurence CE Primary School, Ludlow
St Lawrence Primary School, Church Stretton
St Leonard's CE Primary School, Bridgnorth
St Lucia's CE Primary School, Upton Magna
St Martin's School, St Martin's
St Mary's Bluecoat CE Primary School, Bridgnorth
St Mary's CE Primary School,  Albrighton
St Mary's CE Primary School, Bucknell
St Mary's CE Primary School, Shawbury
St Thomas and St Anne CE Primary School, Cruckmeole
Selattyn CE Primary School, Selattyn
Sheriffhales Primary School, Sheriffhales
Shifnal Primary School, Shifnal
Shrewsbury Cathedral RC Primary School, Shrewsbury
Stiperstones CE Primary School, Snailbeach
Stoke-on-Tern Primary School, Stoke Heath
Stokesay Primary School, Craven Arms
Stottesdon CE Primary School, Stottesdon
Sundore Infant School, Shrewsbury
Tilstock CE Primary School, Tilstock
Trefonen CE Primary School, Trefonen
Trinity CE Primary School, Ford
Welshampton CE Primary School, Welshampton
West Felton CE Primary School, West Felton
Weston Lullingfields CE School, Weston Lullingfields
Weston Rhyn Primary School, Weston Rhyn
Whitchurch CE Infant Academy, Whitchurch
Whitchurch CE Junior Academy, Whitchurch
Whittington CE Primary School, Whittington
Whixall CE Primary School, Whixall
The Wilfred Owen School, Shrewsbury
Wistanstow CE Primary School, Wistanstow
Woodfield Infant School, Shrewsbury
Woodside Primary School, Oswestry
Woore Primary School, Woore
Worfield Endowed CE Primary School, Worfield

Secondary schools

Belvidere School, Shrewsbury
Bishop's Castle Community College, Bishop's Castle
Bridgnorth Endowed School, Bridgnorth
Church Stretton School, Church Stretton
The Corbet School, Baschurch
The Grove School, Market Drayton
Idsall School, Shifnal
Lacon Childe School, Cleobury Mortimer
Lakelands Academy, Ellesmere
Ludlow Church of England School, Ludlow
The Marches School, Oswestry
Mary Webb School and Science College, Pontesbury
Meole Brace School, Meole Brace
Oldbury Wells School, Oldbury
The Priory School, Shrewsbury
St Martin's School, St Martin's
Shrewsbury Academy, Shrewsbury
Sir John Talbot's School, Whitchurch
Thomas Adams School, Wem
William Brookes School, Much Wenlock

Special and alternative schools

The Keystone Academy, Shrewsbury
Severndale Specialist Academy, Shrewsbury
Tuition, Medical and Behaviour Support Service, Shrewsbury
Woodlands School, Wem

Further education 
Derwen College
Shrewsbury College
Shrewsbury Sixth Form College
Ludlow College
Walford and North Shropshire College

Independent schools

Primary and preparatory schools
Moor Park School, Richard's Castle
Packwood Haugh School, Ruyton XI Towns
The Prepatoria School, Shrewsbury
Prestfelde School, Shrewsbury
St Winefride's Convent School, Shrewsbury

Senior and all-through schools

Adcote School, Little Ness
Bedstone College, Bedstone
Birchfield School, Albrighton
Concord College, Acton Burnell
Ellesmere College, Ellesmere
Moreton Hall School, Weston Rhyn
Oswestry School, Oswestry
Shrewsbury High School, Shrewsbury
Shrewsbury School, Shrewsbury

Special and alternative schools

Access School, Harmer Hill
Acorn Wood, Coton
Amberleigh Therapeutic School, Redhill
Bettws Lifehouse Independent Special School, Shrewsbury
Bridge School, Chelmarsh
Darwin School, Minsterley
The Fitzroy Academy, Cruckton
The Gables Learning Centre, Albrighton
Harlescott House School, Shrewsbury
The Henslow and Evolution School, Bicton
Hillcrest Shifnal School, Shifnal
The Mews, Wem
Oakwood School, Bicton
Options Higford, Higford
Overton School, Ludlow
Physis Heathgates Academy, Prees
Smallbrook School, Sleap
Westbury School, Westbury

References 

 01
Shropshire
Lists of buildings and structures in Shropshire